Weldon Lynn Kennedy (September 12, 1938 – June 13, 2020) was a special agent for the Federal Bureau of Investigation and served for 33 years. He is known for negotiating a peaceful end to the Atlanta Prison Riots and his involvement in the investigation of the Oklahoma City bombing.
He retired as the FBI's No. 2 in command, Deputy Director, in February 1997.

History

Weldon was born on September 12, 1938, in Menlow, Texas, a small community in Hill County that no longer exists. 

After service as an Lieutenant (junior grade) in the United States Navy's Office of Naval Intelligence from 1959 to 1963, Weldon joined the FBI in 1963. In 1987, he earned fame as the special agent in charge during a riot at United States Penitentiary, Atlanta, where he negotiated a 13-day takeover. He was also Special Agent in charge of the arrests and investigation of Timothy McVeigh and Terry Nichols of the Oklahoma City bombing. In August 1995, he was appointed Deputy Director by Director Louis J. Freeh. In February 1997, Kennedy retired and was succeeded by William Esposito, but only for a few months. Thomas J. Pickard assumed the office officially after Esposito.  

After leaving the FBI, Kennedy was hired as Vice Chairman of Guardsmark by Ira A. Lipman.  

He lived with his family in Prescott, Arizona. Kennedy died on June 13, 2020, at the age of 81. His memoir, On-Scene Commander: From Street Agent to Deputy Director of the FBI, was published on September 10, 2007.

FBI
On July 22, 1963, Weldon began training for the FBI in Washington, D.C.  After spending one night in D.C., Weldon was transported by bus to the FBI Academy at Quantico Marine Base in Quantico, Virginia where he received basic training for the FBI.  During sixteen weeks of basic training, Weldon and his fellow trainees were bussed back and forth between Quantico, Virginia and Washington, D.C. every few weeks in order to receive hands on training in Washington.  While Weldon was receiving FBI training, his wife, Kathy, and their son stayed in Texas at Weldon’s parents’ house and also at Kathy’s parents house.

Weldon’s involvement in the Atlanta Prison Riots
On Monday, November 23, 1987, prisoners of the United States Penitentiary in Atlanta, Georgia began rioting in reaction to recent news from Cuba. It had been announced that President Fidel Castro would allow certain Cubans who traveled to the United States during the 1980 Mariel boat lift, to return to Cuba. The Cubans that were allowed to return were individuals that broke laws in the United States, or came to the U.S. with pre-existing mental disorders or criminal records. Many inmates in Atlanta claimed that they would prefer death over the return to Cuba. As many of the Cuban inmates were thought to have served in the Cuban military, there was organization involved in the riot that led to over thirty prison guards being held as hostages by the prisoners. Along with hostages being taken, the inmates also started multiple fires throughout the penitentiary while rioting.

Kennedy was the leader of the FBI in Atlanta, Georgia at the time of the Atlanta prison riots. In order to end the prison riots peacefully, Kennedy had to be extremely careful with every decision he made, especially because prison guards were being held hostage. While interacting with the prisoners, Kennedy and his team learned that the Cuban prisoners wanted outside negotiators that they could trust brought in to the prison. Thus, Kennedy brought into the prison Auxiliary Bishop Agustin Roman of Miami and a group of American Civil Liberties Union lawyers who had sympathized with the Cuban prisoners in the past. After Kennedy explained to both outsider parties what role they would play and how they were supposed to act, he was able to conduct a peaceful end to the prison riots.

References

Deputy Directors of the Federal Bureau of Investigation
Oklahoma City bombing
1938 births
2020 deaths
People from Hill County, Texas
People of the Office of Naval Intelligence